Trematuroides is a genus of mites in the family Trematuridae.

Species
 Trematuroides lindbergi Cooreman, 1960

References

Mesostigmata